The Ped Mall, also known as the Pedestrian Mall, is a pedestrian mall located in downtown Iowa City, Iowa, near the University of Iowa campus. Officially named City Plaza it was completed in 1979 as the centerpiece of the city’s urban renewal project. Landscaping was completed the following year. It was designed by Jack Leaman of Associated Engineers, Inc., in Mason City, Iowa. While pedestrian malls were a common feature of urban renewal projects in the United States, the Iowa City Ped Mall is one of the few that is still in existence. Spanning from Burlington Street to Washington Street and Clinton Street to Linn Street, the Ped Mall serves as a gathering place for students, locals, and transients. It draws large crowds for its summertime events such as the Friday Night Concert Series and the annual Iowa City Jazz Festival and Iowa City Arts Festival. The Ped Mall area also contains restaurants, bars, retail, hotels, and the Iowa City Public Library. The Coldren Opera House was located on the street which has now become the mall. In 2021, it was included as a contributing property in the Iowa City Downtown Historic District.

References

External links
Old Capital Cultural District
Iowa City Jazz Festival 
Iowa City Arts Festival
Iowa City Ped Mall Webcam

Buildings and structures in Iowa City, Iowa
Tourist attractions in Iowa City, Iowa
Pedestrian malls in the United States
National Register of Historic Places in Iowa City, Iowa
Historic district contributing properties in Iowa